Gabrielle Leithaug (born 10 January 1985 in Bergen, Norway) better known by her mononym artist name Gabrielle, is a Norwegian Electropop singer signed to Universal Music.

Early life
Gabrielle was born in Bergen and resided in Hordvik, a neighbourhood in the city's Åsane borough, where she lived for 8 or 9 years. She attended upper secondary school in Fyllingsdalen, for one year, and later attended "Katten".

She worked flipping burgers for around 3 years, and as a cleaner in schools. She also worked as a radio host for a year and a half. She once moved to Stavanger and intended to start an education within reiselivsutdanning, a tourism program. She later studied music at Nord-Trøndelag University College.

She was a member of a gospel choir—Gospel Bergen.

Career
After she switched her focus from English lyrics to Norwegian, she signed a contract with Norway's largest record company, Universal.

In 2011, Gabrielle released her first single "Ring meg" that reached #1 on VG-lista, the official Norwegian Singles Chart, #1 on iTunes, sold 10× Platinum, most streamed single in Norwegian history and was nominated for the Norwegian Grammy in the category "Hit Of The Year". Her second single "Bordet" sold 2× Platinum in Norway.

Lars K. Hustoft, Crystal Air Music is her manager and has produced some of her recordings. Other producers include Joakim Haukaas.

Philanthropy
She is a Goodwill Ambassador for Kirkens Nødhjelp, and in that capacity she visited Syrian refugees in Lebanon in 2014.

Personal life
She identifies herself as having red hair and as heterosexual.

She has said that when she was around 19, she loved someone, and the relationship ended, adding "that is possibly the one [breakup] that cut the deepest".
She has said that she once moved to Stavanger because she had an intimate relationship with someone who lived there. She has said that she had been in a relationship with a guy for several years, before it ended.

Her tattoos include a verse from the Bible. She is a snowboarder, and spent a winter in Salt Lake City. Leithaug has three sisters and one brother.

She is a Christian and regards faith as "rather personal". In 2006 she said that "being a Christian and being an artist, are two different things for me. But I must sing about something I believe in; I like lyrics that go to some depth. A message about tits and ass and stuff like that, does not cut it for me".

In 2012 she said that she "will not take on a role as a spokeswoman for the Christian artists".

Discography

Albums

Singles

Awards and nominations

References

External links
Gabrielle lover å overraske i kveld
Official website
MySpace
Facebook
Kristne, men ikke kristen-artister [Christian, but not kristen-artister]

Living people
1985 births
Musicians from Bergen
Norwegian Christians
Norwegian electronic musicians
Norwegian pop singers
Universal Music Group artists
21st-century Norwegian women singers
21st-century Norwegian singers